"Tearjerker" is the tenth episode of the fourth season of the animated comedy series American Dad!. It originally aired on Fox in the United States on January 13, 2008. As the episode follows a story based entirely from a James Bond film, each American Dad! character plays a role of another: Stan as Agent Stan Smith, Francine Smith as Sexpun T'Come, Hayley as Miss Peacenickel, Steve as S, Avery Bullock as B, Roger as Tearjerker, Klaus as Tchochkie Schmear, Terry Bates as Mannie, Greg Corbin as Peddie, Chuck White as Professor, and Captain Monty as Gums. This episode follows Agent Stan Smith during his infiltration of a movie set, where he finds Matthew McConaughey to be a robot, as well as Johnny Depp during his visit on Tearjerker's island. Tearjerker, the main antagonist of the episode, is a business tycoon who has been abducting celebrities from his spa and replacing them with robots that will star in his horrible movies. While in the meantime he is pressured to accept a marriage by Sexpun T'Come, Stan goes to stop Tearjerker from premiering his tragedy film in cinemas worldwide, making those who watch it cry to death literally.

The sequel to "Tearjerker", "For Black Eyes Only", aired on March 10, 2013, as the 13th episode of season 9.

"Tearjerker" was written by Jonathon Fener and directed by Albert Calleros. It was met with mostly positive reception from television critics, with much of the praise going into the character development of the antagonist. It features guest appearances from Seth Green and Don LaFontaine, along with several recurring voice actors and actresses for the series.

Plot
A British agent jumps out of a cable car, and the woman next to him tells her henchmen to follow him. After the agent kills one of them and prepares to shoot another, Agent Stan arrives to assist him. Stan blows up the henchmen, which creates an avalanche, causing the two agents to fall over a cliff. They open their parachutes, though the British agent and his parachute is crushed by Stan's falling snowmobile.

Stan's boss, B (Bullock), assigns Stan to infiltrate a movie set produced by Tchochkie Schmear (Klaus). Stan travels to Tunisia to investigate one of Tchochkie's movies, Bark of the Covenant. There, he finds Matthew McConaughey working on the set, only to find out he is a robot when Stan exposes him to milk. He also discovers that Schmear had been hired by Tearjerker (Roger). Suspicious, Stan arrives at a Monte Carlo casino, where he is introduced to Sexpun T'Come (Francine) and Tearjerker himself. Stan challenges Tearjerker to play a game in exchange for an invitation to an exclusive spa in the Teardrop Islands. Since he does not know how to play Baccarat or Craps, which are Tearjerker's expertise, Stan declares playing "highest number", in which the players name the highest number they can think of. Stan wins the game and leaves with an invitation to the spa. In the meantime, Sexpun gives Tearjerker Stan's wallet, containing his personal CIA information.

On his way to Tearjerker's island, Stan meets Johnny Depp, who is later replaced by a robot replica that, like the McConaughey robot, malfunctions when given milk. Tearjerker orders Sexpun to seduce Stan, but when she approaches him, he proposes marriage to her, and she falls in love with him as well. Meanwhile, Tearjerker plans to use his masterpiece tragedy film, Oscar Gold, depicting a mentally retarded alcoholic Jewish boy and his cancer-ridden puppy set during the Holocaust, to make the moviegoers literally cry themselves to death. Stan and Sexpun embark on a boat tour explaining Tearjerker's diabolical plans, which ends in Tearjerker's office room, where Tearjerker ties the two to a chair with ropes and forces them to watch his film, which simultaneously premieres in theaters throughout the world.

With everyone on the verge of crying to death, Sexpun accepts Stan's proposal of marriage. Stan suddenly recalls the engagement ring given to him by S (Steve). He asks her to put it on, and Sexpun does so, which causes her breasts to swell, breaking the ropes. Discovering Adrien Brody and Halle Berry in Tearjerker's dungeon below the floor, Stan records a video of their celebrity baby, posts it on the Internet, and makes a mass phone call, redirecting the moviegoers' attention from the film to the video. Enraged, Tearjerker unleashes his soldiers to kill Stan, though instead they end up plummeting through the poorly constructed floor to the bottom. Tearjerker attempts to flee in an escape pod in order to create an even sadder film (6 hours of a baby chimp trying to revive its dead mother). Shortly into the air though, his pod malfunctions and falls into a volcano. After Stan and Sexpun are married, Tearjerker's hand rises from the lava pit briefly, but then falls back in.

Reception
"Tearjerker" was met with mostly positive reception from most television critics. In a simultaneous review with Family Guy, Genevieve Koski of The A.V. Club gave it a mixed review, going on to write, "I wasn't wild about tonight's "Tearjerker", though I did appreciate that it tweaked the Bond conventions into an original story rather than doing a straight-up recreation. It seems so easy to do a Bond parody, especially when your main character is a CIA agent." However, she went on to praise the Tearjerker character portrayed by Roger, writing, "The most obvious inspiration–Roger as the arch-villain–was also the funniest. Sure, "Sexpun DeCome" and "Peacenickel" were chuckle-worthy throwaways, but Roger's–excuse me, "Tearjerker's"–plan to create the world's saddest movie [...] being foiled by Mike, the world's worst contractor, provided for some nice Roger tantrums [...]." She went on to give the episode a C+, the highest grade of the night, scoring higher than the Family Guy episode "McStroke". Donald Campbell of U-Wire gave the episode a four out of five stars, going on to write, "Seth MacFarlane has brought laughter to quite a few Americans - most of them under the age of 30 - with his two series, Family Guy and American Dad".

See also
Don (1978 film), featuring a song sampled in this episode.
A Kitten for Hitler, a real film with a similar plot to the fictional one depicted in this episode
"The Tears of a Clown", the 1979 song by The Beat which two characters dance to in this episode.

References

External links

American Dad! (season 4) episodes
2008 American television episodes